Jon Knuts (born February 4, 1991) is a Swedish professional ice hockey player. He is currently playing with Leksands IF in the Swedish Hockey League (SHL).

Knuts made his Swedish Hockey League debut playing with Leksands IF during the 2013–14 SHL season.

References

External links

1991 births
Living people
Leksands IF players
Malmö Redhawks players
Swedish ice hockey forwards
People from Malung-Sälen Municipality
Sportspeople from Dalarna County